Ngwane may refer to:
Country
 Ngwane, a historical name of Eswatini
People
 King Ngwane III of Swaziland
 King Sobhuza I of Swaziland (Ngwane IV)
 King Ngwane V of Swaziland
Others
Ngwane National Liberatory Congress